The 2016–17 Maryland Terrapins women's basketball team represented the University of Maryland, College Park in 2016–17 NCAA Division I women's basketball season. The Terrapins, led by fifteenth year head coach Brenda Frese, played their home games at the Xfinity Center and they were third year members of the Big Ten Conference. They finished the season 32–3, 15–1 in Big Ten play to win share the Big Ten Regular season title with Ohio State. They were also champions of the Big Ten Women's Tournament for third straight year and received an automatic to the NCAA women's basketball tournament where defeated Bucknell and West Virginia in the first and second rounds before getting upset by Oregon in the sweet sixteen.

Roster

Schedule

|-
!colspan=9 style="background:#CE1126; color:#FFFFFF;"| Exhibition

|-
!colspan=9 style="background:#CE1126; color:#FFFFFF;"| Non-conference regular season

|-
!colspan=9 style="background:#CE1126; color:#FFFFFF;"| Big Ten regular season

|-
!colspan=9 style="background:#CE1126; color:#FFFFFF;"| Big Ten Women's Tournament|-
!colspan=9 style="background:#CE1126; color:#FFFFFF;"| NCAA Women's Tournament

Rankings

See also
2016–17 Maryland Terrapins men's basketball team

References

External links
 Official Team Website

Maryland Terrapins women's basketball seasons
Maryland
Maryland
Maryland
Maryland